The women's 400 metres at the 2007 World Championships in Athletics was held at the Nagai Stadium on 26, 27 and 29 August.

Medalists

Schedule

Results

Heats
Qualification: First 4 in each heat (Q) and the next 4 fastest (q) advance to the semifinals.

Semifinals
First 2 in each semifinal(Q) and the next 2 fastest(q) advance to the final.

Final

References
Heats Results
Semifinals Results
Final Results

400 metres
400 metres at the World Athletics Championships
2007 in women's athletics